More Perfect Union is a progressive non-profit news media organization founded in February 2021 by Faiz Shakir. The outlet, named after a phrase in the U.S. Constitution, specializes in video reporting and opinion coverage about the American labor movement, economic policy, and corporate accountability.

More Perfect Union says its aim is to help "working people to be seen and heard in media coverage," and most of its videos prominently feature everyday workers. In August 2021, More Perfect Union won the Sidney Award for outstanding investigative journalism. Its coverage has also included video interviews or essays by prominent U.S. political figures, including former Senate Majority Leader Harry Reid, Sens. Elizabeth Warren and Jon Tester, Reps. Ilhan Omar and Jamaal Bowman, and FTC chair Lina Khan.

Amazon union drive 
More Perfect Union launched by publishing a video featuring Amazon workers in Bessemer, Alabama explaining why they were organizing a union drive at their warehouse. More Perfect Union was the first national outlet to publish video coverage of the Amazon workers' organizing efforts, and the video went viral, garnering 2.7 million views on Twitter alone. The Amazon union drive in Alabama subsequently became a major national story.

On February 28, 2021, President Joe Biden released a video statement voicing support for the Amazon workers in Bessemer, warning that "there should be no intimidation, no coercion, no threats, no anti-union propaganda." The Washington Post reported, "In early February, staffers at a new media advocacy outlet called More Perfect Union told White House Chief of Staff Ron Klain in a phone call that Biden should speak out on behalf of the Amazon union drive. The group again urged Biden to do so last week."

Snack company strikes 
More Perfect Union gained prominence covering a series of strikes by workers at large U.S. food snack companies, including Nabisco, Frito-Lay, and Kellogg's, that generated national attention. Workers at all three companies described being assigned 12- or 16-hour work shifts for 6 or 7 days in a row, sometimes for weeks on end without a day off.

In August 2021, More Perfect Union won the Sidney Award for its coverage of the Frito-Lay strike. "MPU was the first national outlet to cover the strike," the Sidney Hillman Foundation wrote in awarding the prize. "They published dispatches from the ground over a three-week period which collectively generated over 4 million views and spurred follow-on coverage by outlets such as the New York Times, the Washington Post, CNN, and NPR... After a three-week strike, Frito’s Topeka plant struck an agreement to end the 'suicide shifts' and forced 7-day workweeks."

Also in August 2021, More Perfect Union confirmed with actor Danny DeVito that he had been stripped of his verified status on Twitter after he tweeted a message of solidarity to striking Nabisco workers: "NO CONTRACT NO SNACKS." The news spread widely and contributed to DeVito and his rallying cry becoming popular labor memes.

The Class Room 
In November 2021, More Perfect Union launched an explainer series called "The Class Room". It is "aimed at providing a left-wing answer to PragerU, a YouTube titan of right-wing ideology," the New York Times reported.

More Perfect Union says it receives funding from grassroots donors and Soros foundations, including Open Society Foundations, but does not take money from labor unions or corporations.

External links 
 More Perfect Union

References 

Labor movement in the United States